Algernon Charles Swinburne (5 April 1837 – 10 April 1909) was an English poet, playwright, novelist, and critic. He wrote several novels and collections of poetry such as Poems and Ballads, and contributed to the famous Eleventh Edition of the Encyclopædia Britannica.

Swinburne wrote about many taboo topics, such as lesbianism, sado-masochism, and anti-theism. His poems have many common motifs, such as the ocean, time, and death. Several historical people are featured in his poems, such as Sappho ("Sapphics"), Anactoria ("Anactoria"),  and Catullus ("To Catullus").

Biography

Swinburne was born at 7 Chester Street, Grosvenor Place, London, on 5 April 1837. He was the eldest of six children born to Captain (later Admiral) Charles Henry Swinburne (1797–1877) and Lady Jane Henrietta, daughter of the 3rd Earl of Ashburnham, a wealthy Northumbrian family. He grew up at East Dene in Bonchurch on the Isle of Wight. The Swinburnes also had a London home at Whitehall Gardens, Westminster.

As a child, Swinburne was "nervous" and "frail," but "was also fired with nervous energy and fearlessness to the point of being reckless."

Swinburne attended Eton College (1849–53), where he started writing poetry. At Eton, he won first prizes in French and Italian. He attended Balliol College, Oxford (1856–60) with a brief hiatus when he was rusticated from the university in 1859 for having publicly supported the attempted assassination of Napoleon III by Felice Orsini. He returned in May 1860, though he never received a degree.

Swinburne spent summer holidays at Capheaton Hall in Northumberland, the house of his grandfather, Sir John Swinburne, 6th Baronet (1762–1860), who had a famous library and was president of the Literary and Philosophical Society in Newcastle upon Tyne. Swinburne considered Northumberland to be his native county, an emotion reflected in poems like the intensely patriotic "Northumberland", "Grace Darling" and others. He enjoyed riding his pony across the moors, he was a daring horseman, "through honeyed leagues of the northland border", as he called the Scottish border in his Recollections.

In the period 1857–60, Swinburne became a member of Lady Trevelyan's intellectual circle at Wallington Hall.

After his grandfather's death in 1860 he stayed with William Bell Scott in Newcastle. In 1861, Swinburne visited Menton on the French Riviera, staying at the Villa Laurenti to recover from the excessive use of alcohol. From Menton, Swinburne travelled to Italy, where he journeyed extensively. In December 1862, Swinburne accompanied Scott and his guests, probably including Dante Gabriel Rossetti, on a trip to Tynemouth. Scott writes in his memoirs that, as they walked by the sea, Swinburne declaimed the as yet unpublished "Hymn to Proserpine" and "Laus Veneris" in his lilting intonation, while the waves "were running the whole length of the long level sands towards Cullercoats and sounding like far-off acclamations".

At Oxford, Swinburne met several Pre-Raphaelites, including Dante Gabriel Rossetti. He also met William Morris. After leaving college, he lived in London and started an active writing career, where Rossetti was delighted with his "little Northumbrian friend", probably a reference to Swinburne's diminutive height—he was just five-foot-four.

Swinburne was an alcoholic and algolagniac and highly excitable. He liked to be flogged. His health suffered, and in 1879 at the age of 42, he was taken into care by his friend, Theodore Watts-Dunton, who looked after him for the rest of his life at The Pines, 11 Putney Hill, Putney. Watts-Dunton took him to the lost town of Dunwich, on the Suffolk coast, on several occasions in the 1870s.

In Watts-Dunton's care Swinburne lost his youthful rebelliousness and developed into a figure of social respectability. It was said of Watts-Dunton that he saved the man and killed the poet. Swinburne died at the Pines on 10 April 1909, at the age of 72, and was buried at St. Boniface Church, Bonchurch on the Isle of Wight.

Work

Swinburne's poetic works include: Atalanta in Calydon (1865), Poems and Ballads (1866), Songs before Sunrise (1871), Poems and Ballads Second Series, (1878) Tristram of Lyonesse (1882), Poems and Ballads Third Series (1889), and the novel Lesbia Brandon (published posthumously in 1952).

Poems and Ballads caused a sensation when it was first published, especially the poems written in homage of Sappho of Lesbos such as "Anactoria" and "Sapphics": Moxon and Co. transferred its publication rights to John Camden Hotten. Other poems in this volume such as "The Leper," "Laus Veneris," and "St Dorothy" evoke a Victorian fascination with the Middle Ages, and are explicitly mediaeval in style, tone and construction. Also featured in this volume are "Hymn to Proserpine", "The Triumph of Time" and "Dolores (Notre-Dame des Sept Douleurs)".

Swinburne wrote in a wide variety of forms, including Sapphic stanzas (comprising 3 hendecasyllabic lines followed by an Adonic): 

Swinburne devised the poetic form called the roundel, a variation of the French Rondeau form, and some were included in A Century of Roundels dedicated to Christina Rossetti.  Swinburne wrote to Edward Burne-Jones in 1883: "I have got a tiny new book of songs or songlets, in one form and all manner of metres ... just coming out, of which Miss Rossetti has accepted the dedication. I hope you and Georgie [his wife Georgiana, one of the MacDonald sisters] will find something to like among a hundred poems of nine lines each, twenty-four of which are about babies or small children". Opinions of these poems vary between those who find them captivating and brilliant, to those who find them merely clever and contrived.  One of them, A Baby's Death, was set to music by the English composer Sir Edward Elgar as the song "Roundel: The little eyes that never knew Light". English composer Mary Augusta Wakefield set Swinburne's work May Time in Midwinter to music as well.

Swinburne was influenced by the work of William Shakespeare, Percy Bysshe Shelley, Catullus, William Morris, Dante Gabriel Rossetti, Robert Browning, Alfred Lord Tennyson, and Victor Hugo. Swinburne was popular in England during his life, but his influence has greatly decreased since his death.

After the first Poems and Ballads, Swinburne's later poetry increasingly was devoted to celebrations of republicanism and revolutionary causes, particularly in the volume Songs before Sunrise. "A Song of Italy" is dedicated to Mazzini; "Ode on the Proclamation of the French Republic" is dedicated to Victor Hugo; and "Dirae" is a sonnet sequence of vituperative attacks against those whom Swinburne believed to be enemies of liberty. Erechtheus is the culmination of Swinburne's republican verse.

He did not stop writing love poetry entirely, including his great epic-length poem Tristram of Lyonesse, but its content is much less shocking than those of his earlier love poetry. His versification, and especially his rhyming technique, remain in top form to the end.

Reception
Swinburne is considered a poet of the decadent school. Swinburne's verses dealing with sadomasochism, lesbianism and other taboo subjects often attracted Victorian ire, and led to him becoming persona non grata in high society . Rumours about his perversions often filled the broadsheets, and he ironically used to play along, confessing to being a pederast and having sex with monkeys.

In France, Swinburne was highly praised by Stéphane Mallarmé, and was invited to contribute to a book in honour of the poet Théophile Gautier, Le tombeau de Théophile Gautier (Wikisource): he answered by six poems in French, English, Latin and Greek.

H. P. Lovecraft considered Swinburne "the only real poet in either England or America after the death of Mr. Edgar Allan Poe."

Renee Vivien, the English poetess, was highly impressed with Swinburne and often included quotes of him in her works.

T. S. Eliot read Swinburne's essays on the Shakespearean and Jonsonian dramatists in The Contemporaries of Shakespeare and The Age of Shakespeare and Swinburne's books on Shakespeare and Jonson. Writing on Swinburne in The Sacred Wood: Essays on Poetry and Criticism, Eliot wrote Swinburne had mastered his material, and "he is a more reliable guide to [these dramatists] than Hazlitt, Coleridge, or Lamb: and his perception of relative values is almost always correct". Eliot wrote that Swinburne, as a poet, "mastered his technique, which is a great deal, but he did not master it to the extent of being able to take liberties with it, which is everything." Furthermore, Eliot disliked Swinburne's prose, about which he wrote "the tumultuous outcry of adjectives, the headstrong rush of undisciplined sentences, are the index to the impatience and perhaps laziness of a disorderly mind.".

Swinburne was nominated for the Nobel Prize in Literature every year from 1903 to 1909. In 1908 he was one of the main candidates considered for the prize, and was nominated again in 1909.

Selections from his poems were translated into French by Gabriel Mourey: Poèmes et ballades d'Algernon Charles Swinburne (Paris, Albert Savine, 1891), incorporating notes by Guy de Maupassant; and Chants d'avant l'aube de Swinburne (Paris, P.-V. Stock, 1909). Gabriele D'Annunzio repeatedly emulated Swinburne in his own poetry, and it is believed that his acquaintance with Swinburne was primarily through Mourey's French translations.

Verse drama
The Queen Mother (1860)
Rosamond (1860)
Chastelard (1865)
Bothwell (1874)
Mary Stuart (1881)
Marino Faliero (1885)
Locrine (1887)
The Sisters (1892)
Rosamund, Queen of the Lombards (1899)

Prose drama
La Soeur de la reine (published posthumously 1964)

Poetry
Atalanta in Calydon (1865)
Poems and Ballads (1866)
Songs Before Sunrise (1871)
Songs of Two Nations'' (1875)Erechtheus (1876)Poems and Ballads, Second Series (1878)Songs of the Springtides (1880)Studies in Song (1880)The Heptalogia, or the Seven against Sense. A Cap with Seven Bells (1880)Tristram of Lyonesse (1882)A Century of Roundels (1883)A Midsummer Holiday and Other Poems (1884)Poems and Ballads, Third Series (1889)Astrophel and Other Poems (1894)The Tale of Balen (1896)A Channel Passage and Other Poems (1904)
Although formally tragedies, Atalanta in Calydon and Erechtheus are traditionally included with "poetry".

CriticismWilliam Blake: A Critical Essay (1868, new edition 1906)Under the Microscope (1872)George Chapman: A Critical Essay (1875)Essays and Studies (1875)A Note on Charlotte Brontë (1877)A Study of Shakespeare (1880)A Study of Victor Hugo (1886)A Study of Ben Johnson (1889)Studies in Prose and Poetry (1894)The Age of Shakespeare (1908)Shakespeare (1909)

Major collectionsThe poems of Algernon Charles Swinburne, 6 vols. London: Chatto & Windus, 1904.The Tragedies of Algernon Charles Swinburne, 5 vols. London: Chatto & Windus, 1905.The Complete Works of Algernon Charles Swinburne, ed. Sir Edmund Gosse and Thomas James Wise, 20 vols. Bonchurch Edition; London and New York: William Heinemann and Gabriel Wells, 1925–7.The Swinburne Letters, ed. Cecil Y. Lang, 6 vols. 1959–62.Uncollected Letters of Algernon Charles Swinburne, ed. Terry L. Meyers, 3 vols. 2004.

Ancestry

 See also Flowers for Algernon also called Charly.  Daniel Keyes homage paid to Algernon Charles SwinburnePatience, or Bunthorne's Bride (1881), a Gilbert-and-Sullivan opera that satirizes Swinburne and his poetryPoems and BalladsDecadent movementTristram of LyonesseReferences

Sources
 Leith, Mrs. Disney. (1917), Algernon Charles Swinburne, Personal Recollections by his Cousin - With excerpts from some of his personal letters. London and New York : G. P. Putnam's Sons.
 Swinburne, Algernon (1919), Gosse, Edmund; Wise, Thomas, eds., The Letters of Algernon Charles Swinburne, Volumes 1–6, New York: John Lane Company.
 
 Rooksby, Rikky (1997) A C Swinburne: A Poet's Life. Aldershot: Scolar Press.
 Louis, Margot Kathleen (1990) Swinburne and His Gods: the Roots and Growth of an Agnostic Poetry. Mcgill-Queens University Press.
 McGann, Jerome (1972) Swinburne: An Experiment in Criticism. University of Chicago Press.
 Peters, Robert (1965) The Crowns of Apollo: Swinburne's Principles of Literature and Art: a Study in Victorian Criticism and Aesthetics. Wayne State University Press.
 
 Wakeling, E; Hubbard, T; Rooksby, R (2008) Lewis Carroll, Robert Louis Stevenson and Algernon Charles Swinburne by their contemporaries.  London: Pickering & Chatto, 3 vols.
 
 
 

External links

 Poetry of Algernon Charles Swinburne at the Poetry Foundation.
 "Swinburne as Critic" in T. S. Eliot's essay "Imperfect Critics", collected in The Sacred Wood: Essays on Poetry and Criticism'', 1922.
 
 Swinburne, a eulogy by A. E. Housman
 Stirnet: Swinburne02  Swinburne's genealogy.
 No. 2. The Pines, Max Beerbohm's memoir of Swinburne.
 The Swinburne Project: A digital archive of the life and works of Algernon Charles Swinburne.
  (plain text and HTML)
 
 Archival material at 
 Algernon Charles Swinburne Collection at the Harry Ransom Center 
 Algernon Swinburne Collection. General Collection, Beinecke Rare Book and Manuscript Library, Yale University.

1837 births
1909 deaths
People from Westminster
Artists' Rifles soldiers
19th-century English poets
People educated at Eton College
Victorian poets
English male poets
British erotica writers
Writers from London